Polygonum polyneuron is a species of flowering plant in the family Polygonaceae, native to Japan, Korea, the Kuril Islands, and Primorye. It was first described by Adrien René Franchet & Ludovic Savatier.

It has also been treated as a synonym of Polygonum aviculare subsp. depressum (Meisn.) Arcang.

References

polyneuron
Flora of Japan
Flora of Korea
Flora of the Kuril Islands
Flora of Primorsky Krai